The Ministry of National Defense of the People's Republic of China, or the "National Defense Ministry" for short, is the second-ranked cabinet level executive department under the State Council. It is headed by the Minister of National Defense.

The MND was set up according to a decision adopted by the 1st Session of the 1st National People's Congress in 1954. In contrast to practice in other nations, the MND does not exercise command authority over the People's Liberation Army (PLA), which is instead subordinate to the Central Military Commission (CMC). Instead, the MND itself only serves as liaison body representing the CMC and PLA when dealing with foreign militaries in military exchange and cooperation.

Its official responsibilities had been to exercise unified administration over the development of the armed forces of the country such as recruitment, organization, equipment, training, scientific military research of the PLA and the ranking and remuneration of the officers and servicemen. However, in reality these responsibilities are carried out by the CMC's 15 departments.

Structure 
There are very few departments under the Ministry of National Defense and actually operated by the CMC departments.
 Information Bureau
 International Communications Bureau
 Foreign Affairs Office
 Peacekeeping Office
 Peacekeeping Affairs Centre
 Mobilisation Office

Minister 
According to the Constitution of China, the Minister of National Defense is nominated by the Chinese Premier and confirmed by the National People's Congress or its Standing Committee.

Although the Ministry itself does not exercise much authority, the role of the Minister of National Defense has always been viewed as one of the most important positions in the country's political system. The position of Minister has always been given to an active military officer (with the exception of Geng Biao), a State Councilor and a member of the Chinese Communist Party's Central Committee and member (sometimes a Vice Chairman) of the Central Military Commission, enabling him to take part in the decision making in the PLA, the Government and the Party. In 2018, the incumbent Wei Fenghe became the first Minister to have not come from the PLA Ground Forces.

List of Defense Ministers 

|- style="text-align:center;"
|colspan=7|Vacant  1971–75
|-

See also 

State Council of the People's Republic of China
Ministries of the People's Republic of China
Ministry of Veterans Affairs
State Administration for Science, Technology and Industry for National Defense
National Defense Mobilization Commission
Central Military Commission (China)
National Defense Mobilization Department
Defense diplomacy

References

Citations

Sources

External links 
 Ministry of National Defense of the People's Republic of China  (Chinese)
 Ministry of National Defense of the People's Republic of China  (English)
 中国军网 
 China Military Online sponsored by the PLA Daily

Military of the People's Republic of China
Defense
China
Ministries established in 1954